Maryland Bible College & Seminary, founded in 1988, is a Bible college in Baltimore, Maryland. It is a successor to Stevens School of the Bible.

The college is affiliated with Greater Grace World Outreach and was founded by Carl H. Stevens Jr.

External links
Maryland Bible College and Seminary website
MBCS on Google Street View

Universities and colleges in Baltimore
Educational institutions established in 1988
Bible colleges
1988 establishments in Maryland